Pallasovka may refer to:
Pallasovka (town), a town in Pallasovsky District of Volgograd Oblast, Russia
Pallasovka Urban Settlement, a municipal formation which the town of Pallasovka in Pallasovsky District of Volgograd Oblast is incorporated as
Pallasovka (meteorite), a pallasite meteorite